Lucie Louette-Kanning (born 15 February 1985) is a French retired judoka who competed at international judo competitions. She is a 2013 European champion, two-time European U23 champion, World Junior bronze medalist and Summer Universiade bronze medalist. She has also won the French national judo championships four times.

Louette Kanning narrowly missed qualifying for the 2008 Summer Olympics and 2012 Summer Olympics. Louette-Kanning retired from judo in 2016.

References

External links
 

1985 births
Living people
Sportspeople from Amiens
French female judoka
Competitors at the 2007 Summer Universiade
Medalists at the 2007 Summer Universiade
21st-century French women